Joseph Moore Dixon (July 31, 1867May 22, 1934) was an American Republican politician from Montana. He served as a Representative, Senator, and the seventh Governor of Montana. A businessman and a modernizer of Quaker heritage, Dixon was a leader of the Progressive Movement in Montana and nationally. He was the nation chairman for Theodore Roosevelt running for the presidency as the candidate of the Progressive Party  in 1912.

His term as governor, 1921–1925, was unsuccessful, as severe economic hardship limited the opportunities for action by the state government, and his great enemy the Anaconda Copper company mobilized its resources to defeat reform.

Early life
Dixon was born in Snow Camp, North Carolina to a Quaker family, the son of Flora Adaline (Murchison) and Hugh W. Dixon. His father operated a farm and a small factory. Dixon attended Quaker colleges, Earlham College in Indiana and Guilford College in North Carolina, graduating in 1889. He excelled at history, debate and oratory.  Dixon moved to the frontier town of Missoula, Montana in 1891, where he studied law and was admitted to the bar in 1892. Although he left the Quaker faith, he never abandoned Quaker ideals.

Early career
Dixon served as assistant prosecuting attorney of Missoula County from 1893 to 1895 and prosecuting attorney from 1895 to 1897. In 1900, he served in the Montana House of Representatives. He married Caroline M. Worden, daughter of prominent Missoula businessman Francis Lyman Worden, in 1896. They had seven children: Virginia, Florence, Dorothy, Betty, Mary Joe, Peggy, and Frank. Frank died shortly after birth. Dixon grew wealthy through his law practice and his investments in real estate; to further his political ambitions in 1900 he bought a Missoula newspaper, the Missoulian.

Political career
Dixon took advantage of the internal dissension among rival factions of the Democratic party to rise rapidly in politics. In 1902 and 1904 he won congressional races, and in 1907 the Montana legislature chose him for a U.S. Senate seat. He became an ardent admirer of President Theodore Roosevelt, and joined the progressive wing of the party, fighting the conservatives. He unsuccessfully ran for reelection in 1912, but that year, he was the campaign manager for Roosevelt and chaired the National Progressive Convention that nominated Roosevelt on the third-party Progressive Party ("Bull Moose") ticket as the GOP split between progressives and stand-patters. Democrat Woodrow Wilson won in a landslide.

Out of office, Dixon returned to Montana to look after his newspaper properties, and to battle the Amalgamated Copper Company, the behemoth that dominated both political parties through its corrupt spending. He returned to the Republican Party. He finally sold his newspapers, and they were taken over by Amalgamated. In 1920, Dixon ran for Governor of Montana, and, following farmer unrest that weakened the copper company, Dixon was carried by the national Republican landslide into office as governor, defeating Democratic nominee Burton K. Wheeler comfortably. Although Dixon had many reform proposals, he was unable to enact them because of the severe economic depression in the state, and the systematic opposition of Anaconda Copper. He was defeated for reelection in 1924 by John E. Erickson and for the Senate in 1928, losing to his one-time foe, Wheeler, in the general election.

In 1929 he was appointed First Assistant Secretary of the Interior, and served in that position until 1933. In 1930, he was involved with a project to develop water power on the Flathead Indian Reservation, and with it, a complex network of water rights for the Reservation.

He died in Missoula, Montana on May 22, 1934 due to heart problems. He is interred at the Missoula Cemetery in Missoula, Montana.

References

Further reading
 Karlin, Jules A. Joseph M. Dixon of Montana (2 vol. U of Montana Publications in History, 1974)
 Karlin, Jules A. "Dixon, Joseph Moore"; American National Biography Online Feb. 2000

External links
 

 National Governors Association 
 Montana Historical Society
 The Political Graveyard
 govtrack.us
 Joseph M. Dixon Papers (University of Montana Archives)
 Charles L. Cowell Papers (University of Montana Archives)

1867 births
1934 deaths
People from Snow Camp, North Carolina
Republican Party members of the Montana House of Representatives
Republican Party governors of Montana
Earlham College alumni
Guilford College alumni
Republican Party United States senators from Montana
Republican Party members of the United States House of Representatives from Montana